A Key into the Language of America or An help to the Language of the Natives in that part of America called New England is a book written by Roger Williams in 1643 describing the Native American languages in New England in the 17th century, largely Narragansett, an Algonquian language. The book is the first published colonial study of a Native American language in English.

History
Author Roger Williams was a Puritan who was banished from Massachusetts Bay Colony and founded Providence Plantations which grew into the Colony of Rhode Island. He believed that the king had no right to grant title to Indian land without paying for it. He interacted extensively with the Narragansett and Wampanoag tribes as a missionary, friend, and trader. He extolled some elements of Indian culture as superior to European culture, and he wrote a complementary poem at the end of each chapter within the book.

According to J. Patrick Cesarini, Williams also published the book to rebut Massachusetts' distorted claims in New England's First Fruits (1643) about the first Indian conversions to Christianity (particularly that of Wequash Cooke, a Pequot in Connecticut Colony) and to thereby halt Massachusetts Bay's claims to Rhode Island's territory. Williams' friend Gregory Dexter printed the book in London, England, and the publication brought Williams much public attention.

Notable words
The book helped to popularize and introduce numerous American Indian loan words into the English lexicon, including:
Moccasin
Moose
Papoose
Powwow
Quahog
Squash (askutasquash) 
Squaw
Succotash

See also
The Bloudy Tenent of Persecution for Cause of Conscience

References

External links
 A key into the language of America by Roger Williams (Providence, 1936)
 "Narragansett Grammar"
A Key into the Language of America – digitization of a first edition copy held at the John Carter Brown Library

1643 books
History books about the United States
Linguistics books
Rhode Island culture
Eastern Algonquian languages
Indigenous languages of the North American eastern woodlands